Stri Dharma was the magazine of the Women's Indian Association which was first published in January 1918 by two Theosophist feminists –Margaret Cousins and Dorothy Jinarajadasa– and continued until August 1936.  Its title was Sanskrit for the dharma of women: their right way.

References

Citations

Sources
 

 

1918 establishments in India
1936 disestablishments in India
Defunct journals
Feminism in India
Feminist magazines
Magazines established in 1918
Magazines disestablished in 1936